Joseph Hannigan (1904 – 14 April 1957) was an Irish politician and medical practitioner. Hannigan was first elected to Dáil Éireann as an Independent Teachta Dála (TD) for the Dublin South constituency at the 1937 general election. He was re-elected at the 1938 general election, and in 1939 he joined the Labour Party. He lost his seat at the 1943 general election. He left the Labour Party in 1943. He was subsequently elected to the 4th Seanad in 1943 by the Administrative Panel. He did not contest the 1944 Seanad election.

References

1904 births
1957 deaths
Independent TDs
Labour Party (Ireland) TDs
Members of the 9th Dáil
Members of the 10th Dáil
Members of the 4th Seanad
Politicians from County Dublin
Independent members of Seanad Éireann